Nani Jiménez Puerta (born 9 December 1981) is a Spanish actress and model, best known for her role as Asun Falcó on the television series .

Career
Nani Jiménez gained a measure of popularity in the Valencian Community by playing the role of Assun Falcó on the Nou regional TV series .

In 2009, she joined El Internado, playing Amaia, a student of Laguna Negra Boarding School who has a hard time becoming part of Marcos's group of friends. She remained on the series from the end of the sixth season until the seventh, when it finished.

In 2011, Jiménez played the young resident Ariadna on the 20th season of Hospital Central.

In 2012 she was part of the cast of the series Isabel, portraying Isabel "Zoraida" de Solís, Queen of Granada, who was kidnapped by Sultan Muley Hacén. In 2015 she appeared on the daily series Amar es para siempre, playing Isabel Hernández.

Private life
Nani Jiménez maintains a romantic relationship with actor . They had a son together in 2017.

Filmography

Television
 El cas de la núvia dividida (2006), TV movie
 Mi último verano con Marián (2007) as Carla, TV movie
  (2007–2012) as Assun Falcó Martínez
 El Internado (2009–2010) as Amaia González
 6 motivos para dudar de tus amigos (2011), TV movie
  (2011), miniseries
 Hospital Central (2012) as Ariadna Rubio
 Isabel (2013) as Isabel "Zoraida" de Solís
 Los misterios de Laura, episode "Laura y el misterio de los ratones atrapados" (2014) as Beatriz Vila
 Amar es para siempre (2015) as Isabel Hernández

Feature films
  (2007)
  (2008)
 Sexykiller (2008)
 Cien años de perdón (2015) as Laura

Short films
 Un reflejo de ti (2012) as She

References

External links
 
 

1981 births
21st-century Spanish actresses
Living people
People from Valencia
Spanish female models
Spanish film actresses
Spanish television actresses